This is an article of Horizon League champions. The Horizon League sponsors 19 sports, 9 men's and 10 women's. This article is updated through December 22, 2017.

Men's sports
 Baseball
 Basketball
 Cross country
 Golf
 Soccer
 Swimming and diving
 Tennis
 Indoor track and field
 Outdoor track and field

Women's sports
 Basketball
 Cross country
 Golf
 Soccer
 Softball
 Swimming and diving
 Tennis
 Indoor track and field
 Outdoor track and field
 Volleyball

Membership
All years listed reflect the calendar years in which each school joined and left the conference. For schools that participated only in fall sports, the year of departure is the calendar year after the last season of competition. For schools that participated only in spring sports, the year of arrival precedes the first season of competition.

Current members

Cleveland State Vikings (1994–present)
Detroit Mercy Titans (1980–present)
Green Bay Phoenix (1994–present)
IUPUI Jaguars (2017–present)
Milwaukee Panthers (1994–present)
Northern Kentucky Norse (2015–present)
Oakland Golden Grizzlies (2013–present)
 Purdue Fort Wayne Mastodons (2020–present)
 Robert Morris Colonials (2020–present)
Wright State Raiders (1994–present)
Youngstown State Penguins (2001–present)

Former members
Butler Bulldogs (1979–2012)
Dayton Flyers (1987–1993)
Duquesne Dukes (1992–1993)
Evansville Purple Aces (1979–1994)
La Salle Explorers (1992–1995)
Loyola Ramblers (1979–2013)
Marquette Warriors (1988–1991)
Northern Illinois Huskies (1994–1997)
Notre Dame Fighting Irish (1982–1986, 1987–1995)
Oklahoma City Chiefs (1979–1985)
Oral Roberts Golden Eagles (1979–1987)
Saint Louis Billikens (1981–1991)
UIC Flames (1994–2022)
Valparaiso Crusaders (2007–2017)
Xavier Musketeers (1979–1995)

Current associate members

Men's tennis 
 Belmont Bruins (2022–present)
 Chicago State Cougars (2022–present)
 Eastern Illinois Panthers (2022–present)
 Lindenwood Lions (2022–present)
 Southern Indiana Screaming Eagles (2022–present)
 Tennessee State Tigers (2022–present)
 Tennessee Tech Golden Eagles (2022–present)

Women's tennis 
 Chicago State Cougars (2022–present)

Former associate member

Men's soccer 
 Belmont Btuins (2014–2018)

Sports sponsored

Men's

Women's

Sports championship totals
This table includes all the championships earned by sport. A – denotes that the school never participated in the sport in the conference. These totals are through July 1, 2017.

Men's

Women's

Titles per university
 Milwaukee 133
 Notre Dame 111
 Butler 96
 UIC 70
 Green Bay 60
 Detroit 50
 Loyola of Chicago 50
 Wright State 43
 Cleveland State 38
 Youngstown State 35
 Evansville 31
 Oral Roberts 31
 Xavier 27
 Oakland 24
 Valparaiso 20
 Northern Illinois 10
 Oklahoma City 7
 Dayton 4
 Saint Louis 4
 La Salle 3
 Marquette 3
 Northern Kentucky 2
 IUPUI 1
 Duquesne 0

Sports

All-sport champion

McCafferty Trophy

The James J. McCafferty Trophy is awarded annually by the Horizon League to signify the leagues all-sport champion. Created in 1980, it was named for Jim McCafferty, who served as the first Commissioner of the Midwestern City Conference (now the Horizon League). Schools earn performance points based on their finish in all 19 championship sports the Horizon League offers. For the sports of baseball, softball, men's and women's soccer, women's volleyball, and men's and women's basketball, points are awarded based on combined regular season and championship finish. All other sports are based on finish in the League championship.

 Note, the McCafferty Trophy is not included in the championship totals. Also not all schools sponsor every sport that is calculated into the McCafferty points system.

Number of McCafferty Championships won by school
Butler: 8
Milwaukee: 7
Notre Dame: 7
Oral Roberts: 7 
Oakland: 6
Cleveland State: 2
UIC: 2
Evansville: 2
Wright State: 1
Northern Illinois: 1

Men's

Baseball

Number of baseball titles by school
UIC: 16 (11 regular season, 5 tournament)
Oral Roberts: 12 (6 regular season, 6 tournament)
Wright State: 11 (5 regular season, 6 tournament)
Notre Dame: 11 (6 regular season, 5 tournament)
Milwaukee: 7 (3 regular season, 4 tournament)
Detroit: 6 (5 regular season, 1 tournament)
Evansville: 6 (4 regular season, 2 tournament)
Butler: 5 (3 regular season, 2 tournament)
Xavier: 4 (4 regular season, 0 tournament)
Valparaiso: 3 (1 regular season, 2 tournament)
Oklahoma City: 2 (1 regular season, 1 tournament)
Youngstown State: 2 (0 regular season, 2 tournament)
Northern Illinois: 1 (0 regular season, 1 tournament)

Men's basketball

Number of men's basketball titles by school
Butler: 17 (10 regular season, 7 tournament)
Xavier: 15 (8 regular season, 7 tournament)
Milwaukee: 8 (4 regular season, 4 tournament)
Evansville: 7 (5 regular season, 2 tournament)
Valparaiso: 7 (5 regular season, 2 tournament)
Detroit: 5 (2 regular season, 3 tournament)
Loyola: 5 (3 regular season, 2 tournament)
Green Bay: 4 (2 regular season, 2 tournament)
UIC: 3 (1 regular season, 2 tournament)
Oral Roberts: 3 (1 regular season, 2 tournament)
Wright State: 3 (1 regular season, 2 tournament)
Cleveland State: 2 (1 regular season, 1 tournament)
Northern Kentucky: 2 (1 regular season, 1 tournament)
Dayton: 1 (0 regular season, 1 tournament)
Northern Illinois: 1 (0 regular season, 1 tournament)
Oklahoma City: 1 (0 regular season, 1 tournament)
Oakland: 1 (1 regular season, 0 tournament)

Men's cross country

Number of men's cross country titles by school
Butler: 14
Notre Dame: 10
Loyola: 7
Oral Roberts: 4
Detroit: 2
Oakland: 2
Youngstown State: 2

Men's golf

Number of men's golf titles by school
Cleveland State: 9
Detroit: 7
Oral Roberts: 6
Wright State: 5
Xavier: 4
Notre Dame: 3
Valparaiso: 1
Evansville: 1
Loyola: 1
Oklahoma City: 1

Men's soccer

Number of men's soccer titles by school
Butler: 12 (7 regular season, 5 tournament)
UIC: 11 (6 regular season, 5 tournament)
Milwaukee: 10 (5 regular season, 5 tournament)
Evansville: 8 (3 regular season, 5 tournament)
Loyola: 5 (2 regular season, 3 tournament)
Notre Dame: 5 (2 regular season, 3 tournament)
Detroit: 4 (3 regular season, 1 tournament)
Oakland: 3 (1 regular season, 2 tournament)
Green Bay: 3 (2 regular season, 1 tournament)
Xavier: 2 (2 regular season, 0 tournament)
Saint Louis: 1 (1 regular season, 0 tournament)
Valparaiso: 1 (1 regular season, 0 tournament)
Wright State: 1 (1 regular season, 0 tournament)
Cleveland State: 1 (0 regular season, 1 tournament)

Men's swimming and diving

Number of men's swimming and diving titles by school
Wright State: 8
Notre Dame: 6
Milwaukee: 4
Cleveland State: 4 
Oakland: 4
Evansville: 3 
La Salle: 3
Green Bay: 1
UIC: 1

Men's tennis

Number of men's tennis titles by school
Butler: 9
Notre Dame: 7
Cleveland State: 5
Oral Roberts: 4
Green Bay: 3
Oklahoma City: 3
Valparaiso: 2
Evansville: 2
Northern Illinois: 2
Wright State: 1

Men's track and field

Number of men's track and field titles by school
Milwaukee: 32 (16 indoor, 16 outdoor)
Notre Dame: 11 (11 indoor, 0 outdoor)
Youngstown State: 6 (3 indoor, 3 outdoor)
Detroit: 3 (2 indoor, 1 outdoor)
Oral Roberts: 2 (2 indoor, 0 outdoor)
Loyola: 2 (2 indoor, 0 outdoor)
Butler: 1 (1 indoor, 0 outdoor)

Women's

Women's basketball

Number of women's basketball titles by school
Green Bay: 35 (20 regular season, 15 tournament)
Notre Dame: 10 (5 regular season, 5 tournament)
Milwaukee: 4 (2 regular season, 2 tournament)
Butler: 3 (2 regular season, 1 tournament)
Detroit: 3 (2 regular season, 1 tournament)
Cleveland State: 2 (0 regular season, 2 tournament)
Wright State: 2 (1 regular season, 1 tournament)
Xavier: 2 (1 regular season, 1 tournament)
Evansville: 1 (1 regular season, 0 tournament)
Loyola: 1 (1 regular season, 0 tournament)
Northern Illinois: 1 (0 regular season, 1 tournament)

Women's cross country

Number of women's cross country titles by school
Butler: 13
Loyola: 6
Notre Dame: 4
Oakland: 3
Youngstown State: 2
Detroit: 2
Dayton: 2
Milwaukee: 1

Women's golf

Number of women's golf titles by school
Butler: 6
Detroit: 3
Youngstown State: 3
Cleveland State: 1
Oakland: 1
Loyola: 1

Women's soccer

Number of women's soccer titles by school
Milwaukee: 28 (18 regular season, 10 tournament)
Notre Dame: 6 (4 regular season, 2 tournament)
Butler: 5 (4 regular season, 1 tournament)
Loyola: 5 (2 regular season, 3 tournament)
Wright State: 4 (1 regular season, 3 tournament)
Detroit: 3 (1 regular season, 2 tournament)
Valparaiso: 2 (1 regular season, 1 tournament)
Oakland: 1 (0 regular season, 1 tournament)
IUPUI: 1 (0 regular season, 1 tournament)
Northern Kentucky: 1 (0 regular season, 1 tournament)

Softball

Number of softball titles by school
UIC: 22 (14 regular season, 8 tournament)
Notre Dame: 10 (5 regular season, 5 tournament)
Detroit: 6 (2 regular season, 4 tournament)
Loyola: 6 (6 regular season, 0 tournament)
Cleveland State: 4 (2 regular season, 2 tournament)
Wright State: 4 (0 regular season, 4 tournament)
Valparaiso: 4 (1 regular season, 3 tournament)
Northern Illinois: 2 (1 regular season, 1 tournament)
Green Bay: 3 (1 regular season, 2 tournament)
Oakland: 2 (1 regular season, 1 tournament)
Youngstown State: 1 (0 regular season, 1 tournament)

Women's swimming and diving

Number of women's swimming and diving titles by school
Green Bay: 9
Notre Dame: 9
Wright State: 5
Oakland: 4
Milwaukee: 3
Evansville: 1

Women's tennis

Number of women's tennis titles by school
UIC: 17
Notre Dame: 7
Youngstown State: 4
Evansville: 2
Green Bay: 1

Women's track and field

Number of women's track and field titles by school
Milwaukee: 16 (9 indoor, 7 outdoor)
Youngstown State: 16 (6 indoor, 10 outdoor)
Detroit: 6 (4 indoor, 2 outdoor)
Notre Dame: 4 (4 indoor, 0 outdoor)
Marquette: 3 (3 indoor, 0 outdoor)
Loyola: 2 (1 indoor, 1 outdoor)
Oakland: 1 (1 indoor, 0 outdoor)
Butler: 1 (1 indoor, 0 outdoor)

Women's volleyball

Number of women's volleyball titles by school
Milwaukee: 21 (13 regular season, 8 tournament)
Cleveland State: 10 (5 regular season, 5 tournament)
Butler: 10 (6 regular season, 4 tournament)
Loyola: 9 (4 regular season, 5 tournament).
Notre Dame: 8 (4 regular season, 4 tournament)
Northern Illinois: 3 (2 regular season, 1 tournament)
Saint Louis: 3 (1 regular season, 2 tournament)
Oakland: 2 (1 regular season, 1 tournament)
Dayton: 1 (0 regular season, 1 tournament)
Green Bay: 1 (0 regular season, 1 tournament)

References

Sources
http://horizonleague.org
https://web.archive.org/web/20081223215844/http://horizonleague.cstv.com/ot/hori-awards.html
https://web.archive.org/web/20131222221129/http://www.horizonleague.org/championships.html
http://grfx.cstv.com/photos/schools/hori/sports/m-basebl/auto_pdf/ASRB-Baseball.pdf 
http://grfx.cstv.com/photos/schools/hori/sports/m-baskbl/auto_pdf/Records-MBB.pdf 
http://grfx.cstv.com/photos/schools/hori/sports/m-soccer/auto_pdf/Records-MSOC.pdf 
http://grfx.cstv.com/photos/schools/hori/sports/w-baskbl/auto_pdf/Records-WBB.pdf 
http://grfx.cstv.com/photos/schools/hori/sports/w-softbl/auto_pdf/ASRB-Softball.pdf 
http://grfx.cstv.com/photos/schools/hori/sports/w-soccer/auto_pdf/Records-WSOC.pdf 
http://grfx.cstv.com/photos/schools/hori/sports/w-volley/auto_pdf/Records-VB.pdf 
http://grfx.cstv.com/photos/schools/hori/sports/c-swim/auto_pdf/Records-SWM.pdf 
http://grfx.cstv.com/photos/schools/hori/sports/c-xc/auto_pdf/Records-XC.pdf 
http://grfx.cstv.com/photos/schools/hori/sports/c-tennis/auto_pdf/ASRB-Tennis.pdf 
http://grfx.cstv.com/photos/schools/hori/sports/c-golf/auto_pdf/ASRB-Golf.pdf 
http://grfx.cstv.com/photos/schools/hori/sports/c-track/auto_pdf/ASRB-OutdoorTrack.pdf 
http://grfx.cstv.com/photos/schools/hori/sports/c-track/auto_pdf/Records-ITF.pdf 

Horizon League
Champions